The inscription of Abercius is the Greek epitaph of Abercius, Bishop of Hieropolis (died ca. 167), in Phrygia. It is an important example of early Christian epigraphy.

Archeology and context
About the middle of the 2nd century, Abercius left his episcopal city and visited Rome. On his way home he travelled through Syria and Mesopotamia, and was received with great honours in various places. He died shortly after his return to Hieropolis, but not before he had composed his own epitaph, conveying a most vivid impression of all he had admired during his stay in Rome. This epitaph may well have inspired the Life of Abercius such as it has come down to us, since all its details may be explained by the hints contained in the inscription, or else belong to the common foundation of all legends of saints. 

The Life, as a matter of fact, includes a transcription of the epitaph. Tillemont was greatly struck by the ideas therein expressed, and Pitra endeavoured to prove its authenticity and its important bearing on Christian symbolism. Ernest Renan regarded both the Life and inscription as fanciful compositions, but in 1882 the Scottish archaeologist and scholar William Ramsay discovered at Kelendres, near Synnada, in the Roman province of Phrygia Salutaris (in Asia Minor, modern Anatolia), a Christian stele (inscribed slab) bearing the date of the year 300 of the Phrygian era (AD 216). The inscription in question recalled the memory of a certain Alexander, son of Anthony. De Rossi and Duchesne at once recognized in it phrases similar to those in the epitaph of Abercius. On comparison it was found that the inscription in memory of Alexander corresponded, almost word for word, with the first and last verses of the epitaph of the Bishop of Hieropolis; all the middle part was missing. Mr. Ramsay, on a second visit to the site of Hieropolis, in 1883, discovered two new fragments covered with inscriptions, built into the masonry of the public baths. These fragments, which are now in the Vatican Christian Museum, filled out the middle part of the stele inscribed with the epitaph of Abercius.

Reconstructed epitaph 
It now became possible, with the help of the text preserved in the Life, to restore the original text of the epitaph with practical certainty. Certain lacunae, letters effaced or cut off by breaks in the stone, have been the subject of profound discussions, resulting in a text which may henceforth be looked on as settled, which it may be useful to give here.
 
The capital letters at the beginning and end of the inscription represent the parts found on the inscription of Alexander, the son of Anthony, those of the middle part are the remaining fragments of the epitaph of Abercius, while the small letters give the reading according to the manuscripts of the Life:

The citizen of a chosen city, this [monument] I made [while] living, that there I might have in time a resting-place of my body, [I] being by name Abercius, the disciple of a holy shepherd who feeds flocks of sheep [both] on mountains and on plains, who has great eyes that see everywhere. For this [shepherd] taught me [that the] book [of life] is worthy of belief. And to Rome he sent me to contemplate majesty, and to see a queen golden-robed and golden-sandalled; there also I saw a people bearing a shining mark. And I saw the land of Syria and all [its] cities; Nisibis [I saw] when I passed over Euphrates. But everywhere I had brethren. I had Paul ... Faith everywhere led me forward, and everywhere provided as my food a fish of exceeding great size, and perfect, which a holy virgin drew with her hands from a fountain and this it [faith] ever gives to its friends to eat, it having wine of great virtue, and giving it mingled with bread. These things I, Abercius, having been a witness [of them] told to be written here. Verily I was passing through my seventy-second year. He that discerneth these things, every fellow-believer [namely], let him pray for Abercius. And no one shall put another grave over my grave; but if he do, then shall he pay to the treasury of [the] Romans two thousand pieces of gold and to my good native city of Hieropolis one thousand pieces of gold.

Theories and conclusions
The interpretation of this inscription has stimulated ingenious efforts and very animated controversies. In 1894 G. Ficker, supported by Otto Hirschfeld, strove to prove that Abercius was a priest of the mother goddess Cybele. In 1895 Adolf von Harnack offered an explanation which was sufficiently obscure, making Abercius the representative of an ill-defined religious syncretism arbitrarily combined in such a fashion as to explain all portions of the inscription which were otherwise inexplicable. In 1896, Albrecht Dieterich made Abercius a priest of Attis. These plausible theories have been refuted by several learned archaeologists, especially by De Rossi, Duchesne and Franz Cumont. Nor is there any further need to enter into the questions raised in one quarter or another; the following conclusions are indisputably historical.
 
The epitaph of Abercius is generally, and with good reason, regarded as older than that of Alexander, the son of Anthony, i.e. prior to the year 216 AD. The subject of it may be identified with a writer named Abercius Marcellus, author of a work against the Montanists, some fragments of which have been preserved by Eusebius. As that treatise was written about the year 193, the epitaph may be assigned to the last years of the second, or to the beginning of the third, century.
 
The writer was bishop of a little town, the name of which is wrongly given in the Life, since he belongs to Hieropolis in Phrygia Salutaris, and not to Hierapolis in Phrygia Pacatiensis. The proof of this fact given by Duchesne is all that could be wished for. The text of the inscription itself is of the greatest possible importance in connection with the symbolism of the early church. The poem of sixteen verses which forms the epitaph shows plainly that the language used is one not understood by all: Let the brother who shall understand this pray for Abercius.
 
The bishop's journey to Rome is merely mentioned, but on his way home he gives us the principal stages of his itinerary. He passed along the Syrian coast and possibly came to Antioch, thence to Nisibis, after having traversed the whole of Syria, while his return to Hieropolis may have been by way of Edessa. The allusion to the Apostle Paul, which a gap in the text renders indecipherable, may originally have told how the traveler followed on his way back to his country the stages of Paul's third missionary journey, namely: Issus, Tarsus, Derbe, Iconium, Antioch in Pisidia and Apamea Cibotus, which would bring him into the heart of Phrygia. 

The inscription bears witness of no slight value to the importance of the church of Rome in the 2nd century. A mere glance at the text allows us to note: 
 The evidence of baptism which marks the Christian people with its dazzling seal;
 The spread of Christianity, whose members Abercius meets with everywhere;
 The receiving of Jesus, the Son of God and of Mary, in the Eucharist,
 The receiving of the Eucharist under the species of Bread and Wine.
 The belief in prayers for the dead amongst the Christian people

The liturgical cultus of Abercius presents no point of special interest; his name appears for the first time in the Greek menologies and synaxaries of the 10th century, but is not found in the Martyrology of St. Jerome.

Pliny the Elder wrote that empress Agrippina the Younger (AD 49 - 54) was '"attired in a military scarf made entirely of woven gold without any other material" (Natural History, XXXIII.19) which might be an allusion to the "queen golden-robed and golden-sandalled".

Aures was a gold coin of ancient Rome which might be an allusion to the "shining mark".

References

External links
Greek text - SEG 30.1479 from  Packard Humanities Institute.

Abercius
2nd-century Christian texts
2nd-century inscriptions
Abercius
Roman Phrygia